Phytoecia testaceolimbata is a species of beetle in the family Cerambycidae. It was described by Maurice Pic in 1933. It is known from China.

References

Phytoecia
Beetles described in 1933